Lucius Caninius Gallus (fl. 1st century BC) was a Roman politician who served as consul in 37 BC.

Biography
He was a member of the Plebeian gens Caninia. Gallus was the son of Lucius Caninius Gallus, and a grandson of Gaius Antonius Hybrida. He was thus related to the triumvir Mark Antony, and was a second cousin to Mark Anthony's children, such as Antonia Minor (mother of Germanicus and emperor Claudius) and Cleopatra Selene II, Queen consort of Numidia and Mauretania. Gallus was probably elected to the office of Praetor by 40 BC at the latest. He was then elected consul alongside Marcus Vipsanius Agrippa in 37 BC. He had a son by the same name who was consul in 2 BC.

Gallus may have been a patron of the Latin poet Sextus Propertius.

Sources
 Broughton, T. Robert S., The Magistrates of the Roman Republic, Vol II (1951)

References

1st-century BC Roman consuls
Gallus, Lucius (consul 717 AUC)
Roman Republican praetors
Senators of the Roman Republic
Year of birth unknown
Year of death unknown